John Ames may refer to:

John Ames (captain) (1738–1805), captain in the Massachusetts Militia, blacksmith
John Ames (printmaker) (fl. 1777–1792), Bristol based printmaker
John Judson Ames (1821–1861), California pioneer and newspaper editor
John Edward Ames (born 1949), American writer of Westerns
John Ames (politician) (born 1983), Canadian politician in New Brunswick
John Ames (writer), American writer from Florida, author of Second Serve: The Renée Richards Story
John W. Ames (politician), representative to the Great and General Court
John W. Ames (colonel) (1833–1878), American general and engineer

See also
Jonathan Ames (born 1964), American author
Ames (surname)